Jace Billingsley (born May 16, 1993) is an American football wide receiver who is currently a free agent. He played college football at Eastern Oregon University, and was signed by the Detroit Lions as an undrafted free agent after the 2016 NFL Draft.

College career 
In his last season at Eastern Oregon University, Billingsley finished fourth in the country with 1,931 all-purpose yards, 863 rushing yards, and 506 receiving yards.

Professional career

Detroit Lions 
Billingsley signed with the Detroit Lions as an undrafted free agent on May 6, 2016. On September 3, 2016, he was waived by the Lions and was signed to the practice squad the next day. On December 31, 2016, he was promoted to the active roster, though he was a healthy scratch for the Lions' final regular season game against the Green Bay Packers and playoff game against the Seattle Seahawks.

On September 2, 2017, Billingsley was waived by the Lions and was signed to the practice squad the next day. He was promoted to the active roster on October 25, 2017. In his second career NFL game, on Monday Night Football against the Packers, Billingsley recorded two special teams tackles in the Lions 30-17 victory. He was waived by the Lions on November 11, 2017. He was re-signed on November 14, 2017. He was waived again on November 22, 2017 and later re-signed to the practice squad. He was promoted back to the active roster on December 29, 2017.

On September 1, 2018, Billingsley was waived by the Lions.

New England Patriots 
On September 4, 2018, Billingsley was signed to the New England Patriots' practice squad. He was released on September 12, 2018, and was re-signed six days later. He was released again on September 26, 2018.

References

1993 births
Living people
People from Winnemucca, Nevada
American football wide receivers
Eastern Oregon Mountaineers football players
Detroit Lions players
New England Patriots players